Filip Dewulf was the defending champion but lost in the first round to Goran Ivanišević.

Boris Becker won in the final 6–4, 6–7(7–9), 6–2, 6–3 against Jan Siemerink.

Seeds

  Thomas Muster (second round)
  Goran Ivanišević (quarterfinals)
  Yevgeny Kafelnikov (quarterfinals)
  Wayne Ferreira (first round)
  Boris Becker (champion)
  Marcelo Ríos (first round)
  Todd Martin (semifinals)
  Thomas Enqvist (second round)

Draw

Final

Section 1

Section 2

External links
 1996 CA-TennisTrophy draw

Vienna Open
1996 ATP Tour